†Zygitidae is an extinct family of fossil sea snails, marine gastropod mollusks in the clade Vetigastropoda (according to the taxonomy of the Gastropoda by Bouchet & Rocroi, 2005).  
This family has no subfamilies.

Genera 
Genera within the Zygitidae include:
 Zygites

References